Colepidae is a family of ciliates.

References 

 Key species of the family Colepidae (Prostomatida, Ciliophora) from Lake Baikal. LA Obolkina, Zoologichesky Zhurnal, 1995

External links 
 

Intramacronucleata
Ciliate families
Taxa named by Christian Gottfried Ehrenberg